Amirul Islam is an Indian politician belonging to All India Trinamool Congress. In 2016 he was elected as MLA of Samserganj Vidhan Sabha Constituency in West Bengal Legislative Assembly.

References

Living people
Trinamool Congress politicians from West Bengal
West Bengal MLAs 2016–2021
Year of birth missing (living people)